Daran-dong (달안동, 達安洞) is neighborhood of Dongan district in the city of Anyang, Gyeonggi Province, South Korea.

External links
 Daran-dong 

Dongan-gu
Neighbourhoods in Anyang, Gyeonggi